J. H. Campbell Generating Plant is a 1,420 MW, three-unit coal-fired generating plant in West Olive, Michigan which uses sub-bituminous coal. It is owned and operated by CMS Energy.

Generating capacity
The plant has three units: unit 1 produces 265 MW, unit 2 produces 385 MW, and unit 3 produces 848 MW. All units are planned to be closed in May 2025 as per CMS Energy's plan to eliminate coal use by 2040.

Environmental impact 
In 2018, the plant released 7,917,510 tons of CO2, 4,547 tons of SO2, and 2,572 tons of NOx.

There are three ponds at the plant which are used to store coal ash. Environmental groups like the Michigan Environmental Council claim that heavy metals and other residuals from these ponds have been leaking into groundwater. In response, CMS Energy is now emptying these ponds and transferring the coal ash to landfills.

See also 
List of coal-fired power stations in the United States
List of power stations in the United States
List of power stations in Michigan
Coal Power in the United States
Energy in the United States
Coal Mining in the United States
Electricity Sector of the United States
Coal-fired Power plant
List of natural gas-fired power stations in the United States

References

External links 
Plant owner website

Buildings and structures in Ottawa County, Michigan
Coal-fired power stations in Michigan